Kozelsky District is an administrative and municipal district (raion), one of the twenty-four in Kaluga Oblast, Russia. It is located in the southeast of the oblast. Its administrative center is the town of Kozelsk. Population:   44,775 (2002 Census);  The population of Kozelsk accounts for 43.4% of the district's total population.

References

Notes

Sources

Districts of Kaluga Oblast